The Gordon Bennett Cup (or ) is the world's oldest gas balloon race, and is "regarded as the premier event of world balloon racing" according to the Los Angeles Times.  Referred to as the "Blue Ribbon" of aeronautics, the first race started from Paris, France, on September 30, 1906.  The event was sponsored by James Gordon Bennett Jr., the millionaire sportsman and owner of the New York Herald newspaper.  According to the organizers, the aim of the contest "is simple: to fly the furthest distance from the launch site."  The contest ran from 1906 to 1938, interrupted by World War I and in 1931, but was suspended in 1939 when the hosts, Poland, were invaded at the start of World War II.  The event was not resurrected until 1979, when American Tom Heinsheimer, an atmospheric physicist, gained permission from the holders to host the trophy.  The competition was not officially reinstated by the Fédération Aéronautique Internationale (FAI) until 1983.

The record time for the winner of the event is held by Germans Wilhelm Eimers and Bernd Landsmann who remained airborne for over 92 hours in the 1995 race, taking off from Switzerland and landing four days later in Latvia. The distance record is held by the Belgian duo of Bob Berben and Benoît Siméons who, in 2005, piloted their balloon  from Albuquerque, New Mexico, United States, to Squatec, Quebec, Canada. The most successful pilots are French Vincent Leys who won the trophy nine times between 1997 and 2017 (six times as the main pilot, three times as the co-pilot) and Austrian  (won seven times as the main pilot). American teams have won on the most occasions, with twelve victories.

The 2010 competition started in the United Kingdom, with the balloons departing from Bristol on September 25. The race was marred by the loss of the American team during a storm over the Adriatic Sea on October 1. The balloon was missing until December 6, when a fishing vessel found the cabin containing the pilots' bodies off the coast of Italy.  The 2013 event, departing from France and landing in Portugal, was again won by the French in F-PPGB.

Rules
According to the official rules, the competition is open to all National Aero Clubs (NACs) "who have met their obligations to the FAI", with each NAC being allowed to enter up to three teams whose pilots are of the same nationality as the NAC.  Before this, only two teams from any single NAC were permitted to compete in a single competition.  Pilots should have at least 50 hours experience as pilot in command and be authorized for night-time flying.  At least one member of each team must be capable of communicating with Air Traffic Control in English.

The team who wins the contest receives the Coupe Aéronautique Gordon Bennett trophy and the team's NAC will hold the contest two years later (originally the winning NAC would host the competition the following year).  Any NAC winning the cup in three consecutive races will be the final holder of the cup with the  subsequent option to offer a new cup.

Unofficial events
Resurrected in 1979 by American Tom Heinsheimer, the competition was held without official FAI sanction for four years.  Ben Abruzzo and Maxie Anderson secured victory piloting Double Eagle III  in 47 hours from California to Colorado.  The following year, the winning team of Jerry Tepper and Corky Myers floated  from the takeoff point in California.  The 1981 race was won again by Abruzzo, with different co-pilot Rocky Aoki, who covered  before touching down, while the 1982 race was won by Joe Kittinger and Charles Knapp who piloted Rosie O'Grady .  Heinsheimer attempted to gain the copyright over the name "Gordon Bennett" and run the event without FAI sanction.  However the FAI were granted exclusive rights to the name in 1983, and the organization officially reinstated the competition later that year.  Heinsheimer went on to arrange further contests in the United States which were still reported in the national press as being the "Gordon Bennett Balloon Race" or similar.

Incidents 

The 1908 race in Berlin saw the fall of the balloon Conqueror, flown by A. Holland Forbes and Augustus Post. Before the race Forbes had attempted to lengthen the balloon's appendix to give the team a strategic advantage. Instead the balloon hit a fence just after take off, lost two ballast bags, ascended rapidly and ripped open three minutes into the race. The pair slashed off ballast as they fell . Their descent was slowed only as the balloon's fabric caught in the netting and formed a rough parachute. They took hold of the ring above them and lifted their feet as the basket smashed through the tiled roof of a house in the Berlin suburb of Friedenau. Both the men and their instruments survived intact. 

After a week passed with no word from the team, search parties were formed by the Aero Club of America, but many newspapers reported that the men were likely dead. Instead they emerged after ten days, assisted by two local trappers who had been out on a hunting trip and happened to run into them. Hawley had injured a knee, but otherwise the pair were unharmed and received a hero's welcome upon their safe return.

On September 23, 1923, five competitors were killed when they were struck by lightning while six more were injured in storms. Among the dead were Lieutenants John W. Choptaw and Robert S. Olmsted who were killed when their balloon "US Army S6" crashed in Loosbroek, Netherlands. Sixty years later, in 1983, Americans Maxie Anderson and Don Ida were killed as the gondola detached from their balloon during an attempt to avoid crossing into East German airspace.  Anderson and Ida were participating in the "Coupe Charles et Robert" (named for Jacques Charles and the Robert brothers, inventors of the gas balloon) which was run in parallel with the Gordon Bennett Cup.  Following their deaths, the "Coupe Charles et Robert" was never run again.

On September 12, 1995, three gas balloons participating in the race entered Belarusian air space. Despite the fact that competition organizers had informed the Belarusian Government about the race in May and that flight plans had been filed, a Mil Mi-24B attack helicopter of the Belarusian Air Force shot down one balloon, killing two American citizens, Alan Fraenckel and John Stuart-Jervis. Another of the balloons was forced to land while the third landed safely over two hours after the initial downing. The crews of the two balloons were fined for entering Belarus without a visa and released. Belarus has neither apologized nor offered compensation for the deaths.

On September 29, 2010, the 2004 trophy-winning American team of Richard Abruzzo and Carol Rymer Davis went missing in thunderstorms over the Adriatic Sea. On September 30, the USA retrieval crew suggested that the balloon may have ditched in the sea or have been destroyed by lightning. Debris was found on October 1 by search crews but race control determined that it was not from the missing balloon. The search for the missing pair was called off on October 4. The balloon's cabin containing the bodies was recovered by an Italian fishing boat on December 6.

Official winners
Key

Record breaking flights are denoted by the following:

See also

Gordon Bennett Cup in auto racing
Hot air balloon festivals

Notes
The competition was not held from 1914 to 1919 as a result of World War I, not held in 1931, nor from 1939 to 1982.
Canceled as a result of the outbreak of World War II.
Canceled due to bad weather.

References

Further reading

Castellani, Antonio; I cavalieri del cielo. Storia della Gordon Bennett Balloon Cup, Firenze, LoGisma, 2013 .

External links
 Gordon Bennett Cup official website
 FAI

Air racing
Hot air balloon festivals
Recurring sporting events established in 1906
Bennett family
Newspaper events
Gordon Bennett Cup
1906 establishments in France
Ballooning competitions